Juliusburg is a municipality in the district of Lauenburg, in Schleswig-Holstein, Germany. The population was 170 people in 2020.

References

Herzogtum Lauenburg